The Moldovan diaspora is the diaspora of Moldova, including Moldovan citizens abroad or people with ancestry from the country, regardless of their ethnic origin. Very few of them have settled in other parts of the world, but there is a significant number of them in some countries, mostly in the former Soviet Union, Italy, Spain, Romania, Portugal, Greece, Canada, and the United States of America.

List of countries with Moldovan diaspora

See also
 Aromanian diaspora
 Romanian diaspora

References